The Trail of Remembrance and Comradeship (acronym PST), also referred to as the Trail Along the Wire, the Trail Around Ljubljana, or the Green Ring, is a gravel-paved recreational and memorial walkway almost  long and  wide around the city of Ljubljana, the capital of Slovenia. The walkway leads past Koseze Pond and across Golovec Hill.

During World War II, the Province of Ljubljana, annexed by Fascist Italy, was subjected to brutal repression after the emergence of resistance and the Italian forces erected a barbed wire fence—the route of which is now the Trail of Remembrance and Comradeship—around Ljubljana in order to prevent communication between the city's underground Liberation Front activists in Ljubljana and the Slovene Partisans in the surrounding countryside. The barbed wire was set around the town in February 1942 and surrounded it (even after the town's liberation on 9 May 1945) until 26 June 1945, when the town was visited by Tito.

The construction of the trail started in 1974 and was completed in 1985. It is marked by signposts, information boards with the map of the trail, plaques, and metal markers, as well as signposts at the turn-offs. One hundred and two octagonal memorial stones, designed by the architect Vlasto Kopač, have been installed at the former positions of the bunkers. Along the green area adjacent to it, 7,400 trees of 49 tree species have been planted. Since 1988, it has been protected as a designed nature monument.

The trail is used by many residents of Ljubljana each day. The most popular form of recreation on it is walking and jogging. Cycling is also permitted on condition that pedestrians are not endangered. During snowy winters, cross-country ski tracks are provided at some of its sections. Each year since 1957, on the weekend closest to 9 May, the traditional recreational March along the Wire (it held several names since its beginning) takes place to mark the liberation of Ljubljana on 9 May 1945. Those who walk the entire distance and collect stamps at all eight checkpoints receive a memorial badge and a medal.

Because of Ljubljana's growth over the years, some areas of the path now pass through built-up areas. Examples include the segment from Koseze crossing Klagenfurt Street (Celovška cesta) and Vienna Street (Dunajska cesta) and ending near Stožice Stadium.

See also
 Province of Ljubljana

References

External links

Slovene/English brochure about Trail
Google guide 
 Ljubljana: The Green Ring of Ljubljana. Web VR (virtual reality). Boštjan Burger. 8 May 2009 – 9 May 2009.  (Rich media - Web VR compatible media. Retrieved 19 February 2012.

History of Ljubljana
Sport in Ljubljana
Hiking trails in Slovenia
Monuments and memorials in Ljubljana
Protected areas in Ljubljana
Cultural infrastructure completed in 1985
Bežigrad District
Golovec District
Jarše District
Moste District
Polje District
Rožnik District
Rudnik District
Šiška District
Trnovo District
Vič District
Monuments of designed nature of Slovenia
Tivoli–Rožnik Hill–Šiška Hill Natural Park